John Wickliffe was the first ship to arrive carrying Scottish settlers, including Otago settlement founder Captain William Cargill, in the city of Dunedin, New Zealand. The ship was named after a religious reformer, John Wycliffe.

Departing with 97 passengers from Gravesend, near London, on 22 November 1847, and from Portsmouth on 14 December 1847, she arrived at Port Chalmers on 23 March 1848. 23 March is now observed as Otago Anniversary Day, although the anniversary actually celebrates the establishment of the Otago provincial government on the same day in 1852. Her sister ship, Philip Laing, arrived three weeks later on 15 April.

Commemoration
One of the more prominent buildings in the Exchange area of downtown Dunedin is named John Wickliffe House in honour of the ship. It stands on land close to where the ship berthed in Dunedin.

Wickliffe Street in Port Chalmers is named after the ship.

References

External links

 Transcript of the passenger list of the John Wickliffe

1841 ships
History of Dunedin
Immigration to New Zealand
Port Chalmers
1840s in Dunedin